David Fair Young (born May 17, 1979) is a former American football safety of the National Football League (NFL). He was drafted by the Jacksonville Jaguars in the sixth round of the 2003 NFL Draft. He played college football at Georgia Southern.

Young was also a member of the Cleveland Browns, New York Jets, Green Bay Packers, Houston Texans and Edmonton Eskimos.

1979 births
Living people
Players of American football from Columbia, South Carolina
Players of Canadian football from Columbia, South Carolina
American football safeties
American players of Canadian football
Canadian football defensive backs
Georgia Southern Eagles football players
Jacksonville Jaguars players
Cleveland Browns players
New York Jets players
Houston Texans players
Edmonton Elks players
Green Bay Packers players